Amy Vachon (1978) is an American basketball coach and a former player. A long-time assistant at the University of Maine, Vachon took over as head coach following Richard Barron's medical absence began on January 6. As interim head coach, Vachon led the 2016–17 Lady Black Bears to an 11–6 record, including a trip to the finals of the 2017 America East women's basketball tournament. In April 2017, she was named interim head coach for the 2017–18 season. Following the end of the regular season, one in which Maine was named the America East conference regular season champion, Vachon was named Maine's permanent head coach.

Playing career
Vachon attended Cony High School and was twice Gatorade Player of the Year. Vachon is the daughter of long-time Cony high school head coach Paul Vachon. While in high school, Vachon played on two-state championships teams and was a four-year All-State Basketball Selection and a two-time Gatorade Player of the Year. Vachon was honored as Miss Maine Basketball and the High School Athlete of the Year in 1996. She spent four seasons as a player at Maine, during which time she became one of the all-time assistant leaders in women's college basketball history. Vachon, who was inducted into the Maine Sports Hall of Fame in 2016, holds the Maine and America East records for the most assists in a season (234) and in a career (759). When hired in 2011, she ranked 22nd all-time in NCAA history in career assists. Vachon earned a spot on the America East All-Tournament Team in 1999.

Head coaching record

References

External links
 University of Maine Biography

1979 births
Living people
American women's basketball coaches
American women's basketball players
Basketball coaches from Maine
Basketball players from Maine
Maine Black Bears women's basketball coaches
Maine Black Bears women's basketball players
Sportspeople from Augusta, Maine